Lenin Square is the main square in Donetsk, the capital of the quasi-state breakaway republic of the Donetsk People's Republic. It is located between the streets of Artem, Postyshev, Gurov, and Komsomolskiy Avenue.

It was formed between 1927 and 1967. In 1967, to commemorate the 50th anniversary of the Bolshevik revolution, a monument to Lenin was erected on Lenin's Square.

Many notable events have occurred on the square recently, including the following: 
 The protest by pro-Russian separatists against the Ukrainian Government took place on the square.
 Parades of the separatist government in honor of Victory Day, May 1, and the founding of the DPR take place on the square.

Landmarks 
 Donbass Palace
 Donetsk Symphony Orchestra
 Donetsk National Academic Ukrainian Musical and Drama Theatre
 Ministry of Coal Industry of Ukraine
 Executive Committee of the Voroshilovsky district

Gallery

See also 
 Donetsk
 List of places named after Vladimir Lenin

References 

Squares in Donetsk